Frank McCarthy may refer to:

Frank McCarthy (producer) (1912–1986), secretary of the General Staff of the United States Department of War during World War II
Frank McCarthy (artist) (1924–2002), American artist and realist painter